SketchCom was a 1998 Canadian television comedy series, created by Roger Abbott and Don Ferguson of the Royal Canadian Air Farce. The series aired on Monday evenings, 7:30 pm in most time zones.

The first of the series' 13 episodes aired 5 October 1998 and aired most weeks until early 1999. Different sketch performers were featured in each episode. CBC did not renew SketchCom for the 1999-2000 television season.

Program funding included contributions from Bell Canada's Broadcast and New Media Fund and the Canadian Television Fund.

Episodes and guest performers
Original air dates of selected episodes, with guests:

 5 October 1998 - debut
 26 October 1998 - Corky and the Juice Pigs
 2 November 1998 - Illustrated Men (David Huband, Bruce Hunter and Adrian Truss)
 11 January 1999 - Fred's Bicycle Repair Shop and Urban Myth
 25 January 1999 - The Stand-Ins, The Bobroom
 1 February 1999 - Fast and Dirty

References

External links

 

1998 Canadian television series debuts
1999 Canadian television series endings
CBC Television original programming
1990s Canadian sketch comedy television series